Exhibition Station (Wembley) was a railway station in Wembley Park in what is now the London Borough of Brent.  It was built on a spur to connect the 1924-5 British Empire Exhibition to London Marylebone.

Exhibition Station opened on 28 April 1923, the day of Wembley Stadium's first FA cup final. It was later renamed Wembley Exhibition, and then, in February 1928, Wembley Stadium (now the name of the former Wembley Hill station to the southwest).

It was only really used to transport spectators to Wembley events. It stopped carrying passengers in May 1968 and officially closed on 1 September 1969.

Services

References

Disused railway stations in the London Borough of Brent
Railway stations in Great Britain opened in 1923
Railway stations in Great Britain closed in 1969
Wembley
Former London and North Eastern Railway stations
British Empire Exhibition